Hitahdut HaIkarim (lit. Farmers Federation) is a settlement movement for private farmers in Israel.

History
Hitahdut HaMoshavot BeYehuda VeShomron (Association of moshavot in Judea and Samaria) was founded in Yavne'el in 1920, making it the oldest agricultural organisation in Israel. In 1927 it was expanded and renamed Hitahdut HaIkarim BeEretz Israel (lit. Association of the Farmers in the Land of Israel). After Israeli independence it adopted its current name. The organisation was affiliated with the General Zionists, and later (as of 1985) with the Liberal Party. It published the weekly Bustenai periodical in conjunction with the General Zionists between 1929 and 1939.

Zionist leader Moshe Smilansky served as its president, whilst Haim Ariav, a General Zionists member of the Knesset, served as its secretary.

Member villages
Several agricultural communities (moshavim and community settlements) are affiliated with the organisation, including:

Adi, community settlement in northern Israel
Bat Shlomo, moshav in northern Israel
Elyashiv, moshav in central Israel
Hararit, community settlement in Western Galilee
Hibat Tzion, moshav in the central Coastal Plain
Kamon, community settlement in the Galilee
Katzir, Jewish locality in northern Israel
Kidmat Tzvi, moshav in central Golan Heights
Korazim, community settlement, Lower Galilee above the Sea of Galilee
Mikhmanim, community settlement Lower Galilee
Neve Michael, moshav in central Israel
Talmei Bilu, moshav in north-western Negev
Yuvalim, community settlement in the Galilee

See also
Agriculture in Israel

References

External links
Facebook page

 
Settlement movements in Israel
Agriculture in Israel
1920 establishments in Mandatory Palestine